Paulin Kouabénan N'Gnamé (12 May 1962 − 21 March 2008) was an Ivorian Roman Catholic bishop.

Ordained to the priesthood in 1989, N'Gnamé was named bishop of Roman Catholic Diocese of San Pedro-en-Côte d'Ivoire, Ivory Coast in 2007 and died in 2008 while still in office.

References

1962 births
2008 deaths
People from San-Pédro, Ivory Coast
20th-century Roman Catholic bishops in Ivory Coast
Roman Catholic bishops of San Pedro-en-Côte d'Ivoire